Apache Tuscany was an open-source software project for developing and running software applications using a service-oriented architecture (SOA).

Description
This lightweight runtime is designed to be embedded in, or provisioned to, a number of different host environments. Apache Tuscany implements Service component architecture (SCA) which defines a flexible, service-based model for construction, assembly and deployment of network of services (existing and new ones).

With SCA as its foundation, Tuscany was promoted to push handling of protocol out of the application business logic into pluggable bindings. As a result, protocols can be changed at only one time with minimal configuration changes. Tuscany also removes the need for applications to deal with infrastructure concerns such as security and transaction and handles this declaratively.

Tuscany provides support for SCA 1.0 specification in Java. It also provides a wide range of bindings (web services, web20 bindings, etc.), implementation types (Spring, BPEL, Java, etc.) as well as integration with technologies such as web20 and OSGi. Tuscany was working on implementing SCA 1.1 that is being standardized at OASIS.

Apache Tuscany also implements Service Data Objects (SDO) which provides a uniform interface for handling different forms of data, including XML documents, that can exist in a network of services and provides the mechanism for tracking changes. Tuscany supports the SCO and the SDO (2.01 for C++ / 2.1 for Java) specification.

The Apache Software Foundation announced in August 2016 that the project was no longer maintained.

References

External links 
 Apache Tuscany Project Home Page
 SCA Home Page at OASIS web site
 "Introduction to SCA bindings" from Ch 7 of Tuscany SCA in Action

Tuscany
Enterprise application integration
Service-oriented architecture-related products